Sale v. Haitian Centers Council, 509 U.S. 155 (1993), is a case in which the U.S. Supreme Court ruled that the President's executive order that all aliens intercepted on the high seas could be repatriated was not limited by the Immigration and Nationality Act of 1952 or Article 33 of the United Nations Convention Relating to the Status of Refugees.

Originally, the United States and the Haitian government made an agreement in 1981 to stop all vessels coming to the United States and return any undocumented aliens who were not refugees and would not be harmed upon return.

After a regime change in Haiti, American policy changed and was interpreted that all undocumented aliens would be sent back unless they landed and made an entry onto the territory of the United States.

The case came before the court on March 2, 1993, and was decided on June 21, 1993. The oral argument for the plaintiff was made by then Yale law professor Harold Koh (from 2009 to 2013, Koh was the Legal Adviser of the Department of State).

The 8–1 decision was delivered by Justice John Paul Stevens with Justice Harry Blackmun dissenting, and overturned a decision of the Second Circuit Court of Appeals.

Criticizing the majority decision in his dissent, Justice Blackmun wrote, "Today's majority ... decides that the forced repatriation of the Haitian refugees is perfectly legal, because the word "return" does not mean return, because the opposite of "within the United States" is not outside the United States, and because the official charged with controlling immigration has no role in enforcing an order to control immigration." (citations omitted)

A slightly different case with the name Haitian Centers Council v. Sale was argued and won by Koh's team of law students from Yale before Judge Sterling Johnson of the U.S. District Court for the Eastern District of New York. Lead counsel was provided on a pro bono basis by Joe Tringali of Simpson Thacher & Bartlett. However, this decision was later vacated due to a negotiated settlement deal made by the Clinton Administration and Yale Law School. The full background and details of both cases are found in the book Storming the Court by Brandt Goldstein.

See also
 List of United States Supreme Court cases, volume 509
 List of United States Supreme Court cases
 Lists of United States Supreme Court cases by volume
 List of United States Supreme Court cases by the Rehnquist Court

Further reading

 'Storming the Court', Goldstein, Brandt, 2005 (Scribner, paperback)

References

External links
 
URL for the current Haitian Centers Council Inc. Website.

United States immigration and naturalization case law
United States Supreme Court cases of the Rehnquist Court
1993 in United States case law
1993 in international relations
Haiti–United States relations
United States Supreme Court cases